Acanthoica is a genus of algae belonging to the family Rhabdosphaeraceae.

The genus was first described by Lohmann in 1902.

Species:
 Acanthoica ornata Conrad
 Acanthoica quattrospina Lohmann
 Acanthoica rubens Kamptner

References

Haptophyte genera